The New German Critique  is a contemporary academic journal in German studies. It is associated with the Department of German Studies at Cornell University. It "covers twentieth century political and social theory, philosophy, literature, film, media and art, reading cultural texts in the light of current theoretical debates." The executive editors are David Bathrick (Cornell), Andreas Huyssen (Columbia), and Anson Rabinbach (Princeton).

See also 
 German studies

References 

Area studies journals
Publications established in 1974
Duke University Press academic journals
Triannual journals